Haverthwaite is a small village and civil parish in the Furness region of Cumbria, England. It is also within the boundaries of the Lake District National Park. It is located several miles east of Ulverston and is near the southern end of Windermere. In the 2001 census the parish had a population of 728, increasing at the 2011 census to 797.

The village gets part of its name from the Old Norse word thwaite which usually refers to a clearing or settlement in the forest.

History 
The village was originally a Viking settlement, but it has been suggested that there may have been a settlement of sorts there before the Vikings arrived.

In the 18th century there were two iron furnaces near the village, one at Backbarrow and the other at Low Wood. The furnace at Backbarrow was supplied from 1711 with iron ore from Low Furness which would have arrived at the quays in Haverthwaite and been transported to Backbarrow by horse and cart. In 1860 the Furness Railway opened its branch line that ran from Ulverston to Lakeside and almost overnight the quays fell into disuse.

In 1798 Low Wood gunpowder works was established and continued production until 1935. The nearby River Leven was used to transport the finished product.

The vicarage was demolished in the 1970s to make way for the new route of the A590.

St Anne's Church was originally a chapel under Colton; it was consecrated in 1825 and extended in 1838. When it was built, it received a grant on condition that 200 sittings were to be 'free and unappropriated for ever'. It appears in the music video of Never Went to Church by The Streets.

Railway 
The village is the starting point of the preserved Lakeside & Haverthwaite Railway, a popular tourist attraction providing connections to Windermere.

See also

Listed buildings in Haverthwaite

References

External links
 Cumbria County History Trust: Colton (nb: provisional research only – see Talk page)
 Cumbria County History Trust: Upper Holker (nb: provisional research only – see Talk page)

Villages in Cumbria
Furness
Civil parishes in Cumbria
South Lakeland District